Southwind Rail Travel Limited  is a leasing company that provides locomotives and rolling stock to railroad companies.

Southwind began service in 1983, operating a heritage railroad passenger excursion train on a 35-mile route in Wilkes-Barre, Luzerne County, Pennsylvania that was owned by the Pocono Northeast Railroad.

SRTL owns ex-Delaware & Hudson ALCO RS-36 diesel locomotive No. 5019, most recently leased to the former Upper Hudson River Railroad, and focuses on leasing locomotives and rolling stock for heritage railroad excursion companies in the northeastern United States. They have partnered with Pocono Northeast, Steamtown USA, Delaware-Lackawanna Railroad, Towanda-Monroeton Shippers Lifeline and Upper Hudson River Railroad.

References

Heritage railroads in Pennsylvania
Companies based in Luzerne County, Pennsylvania
Transportation in Luzerne County, Pennsylvania
1983 establishments in Pennsylvania
American companies established in 1983